The Highland Railway Drummond 0-6-4T or X class were large tank engines originally intended for banking duty. They were designed by Peter Drummond.

Construction
The first four were built by the North British Locomotive Company and delivered in 1909. A second batch of four was delivered in 1911.

Design
The design was derived from that of the class K (0-6-0) tender engines and leading dimensions were very similar although the boiler and firebox are recorded as being 'larger' but by an unspecified amount.

Reputation
They were not popular with their crews, many thought them heavy and clumsy, and several crews had problems with water capacity. It seems their axleboxes were not well-proportioned either as there are reports of consistent hot box problems.

Numbering

Transfer to LMS
They all survived to be taken over by the London, Midland and Scottish Railway (LMS) at the 1923 Grouping. The last was withdrawn in 1936.

References

X
0-6-4T locomotives
NBL locomotives
Railway locomotives introduced in 1909
Scrapped locomotives
Standard gauge steam locomotives of Great Britain